Siem Pang District is a district located in Stung Treng Province, in north-east Cambodia. According to the 1998 census of Cambodia, it had a population of 13,517.

The Khmer Khe language is spoken in Siem Pang District.

References

Districts of Stung Treng province